Francis Henry Smith (1868 – 17 August 1936) was a Reform Party Member of Parliament in New Zealand.

Smith was born in 1868 at Long Bay near Strahan, Tasmania. He came to New Zealand with his parents and obtained his education at schools in Burkes Pass and Timaru.

 
He was elected to the Waitaki electorate in the 1911 general election, but was defeated in 1914 for Timaru.

He died on 17 August 1936.

References

1868 births
1936 deaths
Reform Party (New Zealand) MPs
Unsuccessful candidates in the 1896 New Zealand general election
Unsuccessful candidates in the 1908 New Zealand general election
Unsuccessful candidates in the 1914 New Zealand general election
Members of the New Zealand House of Representatives
New Zealand MPs for South Island electorates
People from Tasmania
19th-century New Zealand politicians